Certifiably Jonathan is a 2007 American mockumentary film directed by Jim Pasternak and starring Jonathan Winters.

Participants
In addition to Winters, the following people appear in the mockumentary:

Reception
The film has a 25% rating on Rotten Tomatoes.  Roger Ebert awarded the film one star.  Nathan Rabin of The A.V. Club graded the film a C−.  Joseph Jon Lanthier of Slant Magazine awarded the film three stars out of four.

Ronnie Scheib of Variety gave the film a negative review and wrote, "Winters deserves better."

Frank Scheck of The Hollywood Reporter also gave the film a negative review and wrote, "Faux documentary about the legendary comedian squanders the rich potential of its subject."

Accolade
The film won the Best Feel Good Feature Film award at the 2008 Feel Good Film Festival.

References

External links
 
 

American mockumentary films
2000s English-language films
2000s American films